This is a list, in alphabetical order within categories, of notable hispanic people of Spanish heritage and descent born and raised in Spain, or of direct Spanish descent.
	 
Note: The same person may appear under several headings.

Actors 

 
 

Victoria Abril (born 1957)
Elena Anaya (born 1975) 
Antonio Banderas (born 1960) 
Javier Bardem (born 1969) 
Pilar Bardem (1939–2021) 
Amparo Baró (1937–2015)
Claudia Bassols (born 1979)
Ana Belén (born 1951) 
Àstrid Bergès-Frisbey (born 1986)  
Juan Diego Botto (born 1975)
Javier Cámara (born 1967)
Mario Casas (born 1986)
Mark Consuelos (born 1970)
Úrsula Corberó (born 1989) 
Penélope Cruz (born 1974) 
Gabino Diego (born 1966)
Lola Dueñas (1908–1983)
Ester Expósito (born 2000)
Angelines Fernández (1922–1994) 
Bibiana Fernández (born 1954)
Fernando Fernán Gómez (1921–2007)
Alba Flores (born 1986) 
Elena Furiase (born 1988)
Juan Luis Galiardo (1940–2012)
Macarena García (born 1988)
Sancho Gracia (1936–2012) 
Chus Lampreave (1930–2016)
Alfredo Landa (1933–2013) 
Sergi López (born 1965) 
Carmen Maura (born 1945)
Jordi Mollà (born 1968)
Lina Morgan (1936–2015)
Sara Montiel (1928–2013) 
Paul Naschy (1934–2009) 
Najwa Nimri (born 1972)
Eduardo Noriega (born 1973)
Elsa Pataky (born 1976)
Fernando Rey (1917–1994) 
Fernando Sancho (1916–1990)
Santiago Segura (born 1965)
Luis Tosar (born 1971)
María Valverde (born 1986) 
Concha Velasco (born 1939)
Paz Vega (born 1976) 
Maribel Verdú (born 1970)

Artists 

David Aja (born 1977), comics artist
Leonardo Alenza (1807–1845), Romantic painter
Hermenegildo Anglada (1871–1959), Catalan modernist painter
Alonso Berruguete (c. 1488–1561), Spanish Renaissance painter and sculptor
Pedro Berruguete (c. 1450–1504), Spanish Renaissance painter
Aureliano de Beruete (1845–1912), painter
Felipe Bigarny (c. 1475–1542), Spanish Renaissance sculptor
María Blanchard (1881–1932), Cubist painter
Lita Cabellut (born 1961), painter
Eugenio Cajés (c. 1534–1574), Baroque painter
Alonso Cano (1601–1667), Baroque painter
Juan Caro de Tavira (fl. 17th century), painter
Juan Carreño de Miranda (1614–1685), Baroque painter
Ramon Casas (1866–1932), Catalan Modernist painter
Antonio del Castillo (1616–1668), Baroque painter
Charris (born 1962), painter
Chumy Chúmez (1927–2003), cartoonist
José de Creeft (1884–1982), Modernist sculptor and teacher
Claudio Coello (1642–1693), Baroque painter
Salvador Dalí (1904–1989), Surrealist artist
Óscar Domínguez (1906–1957), Surrealist artist
Antonio María Esquivel (1806–1857), Romantic painter
Joaquim Espalter (1809–1880), Orientalist painter
Gregorio Fernández (1576–1636), Baroque sculptor
Pasqual Ferry (born 1961), comics artist
Marià Fortuny (1838–1874), Romantic painter
Pablo Gargallo (1881–1934), Cubist sculptor
Antoni Gaudí (1852–1926), Catalan Modernist architect and sculptor
Francisco de Goya (1746–1828), Romantic painter and engraver
Julio González (1876–1942), Cubist sculptor
Eugenio Granell (1912–2001), Surrealist painter
El Greco (1541–1614), Spanish Renaissance painter and sculptor
Juan Gris (1887–1927), Cubist painter
Carlos de Haes (1829–1898), Realist painter
Francisco Herrera the Elder (1576–1656), painter
Francisco Herrera the Younger (1622–1685), painter and architect
Juan de Juanes (c. 1507–1579), Spanish Renaissance painter
Antonio López (born 1936), Realist painter and sculptor
José de Madrazo (1781–1859), Neoclassical painter
Juan Bautista Maíno (1581–1649), Baroque painter
Maruja Mallo (1902–1995), Surrealist painter
Juan Bautista Martínez del Mazo (1612–1667), Baroque painter
Pedro de Mena (1628–1688), Baroque sculptor
Joaquin Mir (1873–1940), Catalan Modernist painter
Joan Miró (1893–1983), Surrealist painter, sculptor and ceramist
Juan Fernández Navarrete (1526–1579), Spanish Renaissance painter
Isidre Nonell (1872–1911), Modernist painter
Darío de Regoyos (1857–1913), Impressionist painter
Jusepe de Ribera (1591–1652), Baroque painter
Lluís Rigalt (1814–1894), Romantic painter
Diego de Siloé (c. 1495–1563), Spanish Renaissance architect and sculptor
Joaquín Sorolla (1863–1923), Impressionist painter
Bartolomé Esteban Murillo (1618–1682), Baroque painter
Pilar Nouvilas i Garrigolas (1854–1938), Spanish painter 
Bartolomé Ordóñez (c. 1480–1520), Spanish Renaissance sculptor
Pedro Orrente (1580–1645), Baroque painter
Rodrigo de Osona (c. 1440–c. 1518), Spanish Renaissance painter
Carlos Pacheco (born 1961), comics artist
Juan Pantoja de la Cruz (1553–1608), painter
Pablo Picasso (1881–1973), painter and sculptor, co-founder of Cubism
Francesc Ribalta (1565–1628), Baroque painter
Luisa Roldán (1652–1706), Baroque sculptor
Pedro Roldán (1624–1699), Baroque sculptor
Julio Romero de Torres (1874–1930), Symbolist painter
Eduardo Rosales (1836–1873), Purist painter
Santiago Rusiñol (1861–1931), Catalan Modernist painter and poet
Alonso Sánchez Coello (1531–1588), Spanish Renaissance painter
Juan Sánchez Cotán (1560–1627), Baroque painter
Antoni Tàpies (1923–2012), abstract Expressionist painter
Luis Tristán (c. 1585–1624), Spanish Renaissance painter
Juan de Valdés Leal (1622–1690), Baroque painter
Juan Van der Hamen (1596–1631), Romantic painter
Eugenio Lucas Velázquez (1817–1870), Romantic painter
Diego Velázquez (1599–1660), Baroque painter
Jenaro Pérez Villaamil (1807–1854), painter
Fernando Yáñez de la Almedina (1505–1537), Spanish Renaissance painter
Ignacio Zuloaga (1870–1945), painter
Francisco de Zurbarán (1598–1644), Baroque painter

Explorers and conquerors  

Lope de Aguirre (1511–1561), soldier and adventurer, explored the Amazon River looking for El Dorado
Diego de Almagro (1475–1538), explorer and conquistador, first European in Chile
 Luis de Moscoso Alvarado (1505–1551), explorer and conquistador. 
Juan Bautista de Anza (1736–1788), soldier and explorer, founded San Francisco, California
Sebastián de Belalcázar (1480–1551), first explorer in search of El Dorado in 1535 and conqueror of Ecuador and southern Colombia (Presidencia of Quito), founded Quito 1534, Cali 1536, Pasto 1537, and Popayán 1537
Fray Tomás de Berlanga (1487–1551), bishop of Panama, discovered the Galápagos Islands
Juan Bermúdez (1450–1520), explorer and skier, discovered the Bermuda Islands
Álvar Núñez Cabeza de Vaca (c. 1490–c. 1559), first European to explore the southwestern of what is now the United States (1528–1536), also explored South America (1540–1542)
Juan Rodríguez Cabrillo (1499–1543), explorer, discovered California
 Andrés Dorantes de Carranza (ca. 1500–1550), explorer and one of the four last survivors of the Narváez expedition.
Gabriel de Castilla (1577–1620), sailor; in 1603 he became probably the first man ever to sight Antarctica
Cosme Damián Churruca (1761–1805), explorer, astronomer and naval officer, mapped the Strait of Magellan (1788–1789)
Francisco Vásquez de Coronado (c. 1510–1554), explored New Mexico and other parts of the southwest of what is now the United States (1540–1542)
Hernán Cortés (1485–1547), conquistador of the Aztec Empire, explorer of Baja California Peninsula
Juan Sebastián Elcano (1476–1526), explorer and sailor, first man to circumnavigate the world
Gaspar de Espinosa (1467/1477–1537), soldier and explorer, first European to reach the coast of Nicaragua, co-founder of Panama City
Diego Duque de Estrada (1589–1647), soldier, explorer, writer
Salvador Fidalgo (1756–1803), naval officer and cartographer, explored Alaska in 1790, he named Cordova, Port Gravina, and Valdez
Miguel López de Legazpi (1502–1572), explored and conquered the Philippine Islands in 1565
Vasco Núñez de Balboa (1475–1519), first European to sight the Pacific Ocean, founder of Darién
Francisco de Orellana (c. 1500–c. 1549), first European to explore the Amazon River
Pedrarias Dávila (Pedro Arias de Ávila, 1440–1531), conquistador, founder of Panama and governor of Nicaragua
Francisco Pizarro (1471–1541), conqueror of the Inca Empire in Peru
Juan Ponce de León (1460–1521), first European to explore Florida (1513); founded the first European settlement in Puerto Rico (1508)
 Alonso del Castillo Maldonado (died c. 1540), explorer and one of the four last survivors of the Narváez expedition.
Gaspar de Portolà (c. 1717–aft. 1784), explorer, founder of Monterey, California
Bartolomé Ruiz (c. 1482–1532), first European to explore Ecuador; pilot for Pizarro and Columbus
Hernando de Soto (1500–1542), explorer and conquistador, first European to explore the plains of eastern North America; discovered the Mississippi river and the Ohio river
Pedro de Valdivia (c. 1500–1554), conquistador of Chile, founder of Santiago, Concepción, and Valdivia
Pedro de los Ríos y Gutiérrez de Aguayo (died 1547), Royal Spanish governor of Castilla del Oro
Vicente Yáñez Pinzón (c. 1461?–1514), explorer and sailor, first European to reach the coast of Brazil
Amaro Rodríguez Felipe (c. 1678–1747), pirate
Isabel de Urquiola (1854–1911), explorer

Film directors

Pedro Almodóvar (born 1949)
Alejandro Amenábar (born 1972)
Montxo Armendáriz (born 1949)
Carlos Atanes (born 1971)
Juanma Bajo Ulloa (born 1967)
Jaume Balagueró (born 1968)
Juan Antonio Bardem (1922–2002)
Juan Antonio Bayona (born 1975)
Icíar Bollaín (born 1967)
José Luis Borau (1929–2012)
Luis Buñuel (1900–1983)
Mario Camus (1935–2021)
Segundo de Chomón (1871–1929)
Isabel Coixet (born 1962)
Agustín Díaz Yanes (born 1950)
Víctor Erice (born 1940)
Fernando Fernán Gómez (1921–2007)
Jesús Franco (1930–2013)
José Luis Garci (born 1944)
Luis García Berlanga (1921–2010)
Manuel Gutiérrez Aragón (born 1942)
Álex de la Iglesia (born 1965)
Fernando León de Aranoa (born 1968)
Bigas Luna (1946–2013)
Julio Médem (born 1958)
Pilar Miró (1940–1997)
Paul Naschy (1934–2009)
Amando de Ossorio (1918–2001)
Ventura Pons (born 1945)
José Luis Sáenz de Heredia (1911–1992)
Carlos Saura (1932–2023)
Santiago Segura (born 1965)
David Trueba (born 1969)
Fernando Trueba (born 1955)
Agustí Villaronga (born 1953)
Benito Zambrano (born 1964)
Lydia Zimmermann (born 1966)
Iván Zulueta (1943–2009)

Leaders and politicians

Medieval ancestors

Pelayo of Asturias (690–737), founding king of the Kingdom of Asturias
Abd-ar-Rahman III (891–961), Emir (912–929) and Caliph of Córdoba (929–961)
Al-Mansur (c. 938–1002), de facto ruler of Muslim Al-Andalus in late 10th and early 11th centuries
Alfonso X of Castile (1221–1284)

Modern 

Isabella of Castile, the Catholic (1451–1504), Queen of Castile and León (1474–1504, with Ferdinand)
Ferdinand II, the Catholic (1452–1516), King of Aragon (1479–1516), Castile and León (1474–1504, with Isabella), Sicily (1479–1516), Naples (1504–1516) and Valencia (1479–1516)
Francisco Jiménez de Cisneros (1436–1517), cardinal, statesman, and regent of Spain
Juana of Castile, frequently called "the Mad", queen of Castile and León; daughter of Isabella and Ferdinand
Charles V (1500–1558), Holy Roman Emperor (1530–1556 but did not formally abdicate until 1558), ruler of the Burgundian territories (1506–1555), King of Spain (1516–1556), King of Naples and Sicily (1516–1554), Archduke of Austria (1519–1521), King of the Romans (or German King); often referred to as "Carlos V", but he ruled officially as "Carlos I", hence "Charles I of Spain"
Philip II (1526–1598), King of Spain (1556–1598)
Philip V (1683–1746), King of Spain (1700–1746)
Charles III (1716–1788), King of Spain (1759–1788)
Ferdinand VII (1784–1833), King of Spain (1813–1833)

Contemporary 

Leopoldo O'Donnell, Duke of Tetuan (1809–1867), general and Prime Minister (1856; 1858–1863; 1864–1866)
Juan Prim (1814–1870), general, liberal leader, revolutionary and statesman
Antonio Cánovas del Castillo (1828–1897), Prime Minister
Fernando de los Ríos Urruti (1879–1949) was a Minister of Justice, Minister of State, and a Spanish Politician.
20th and 21st centuries:
Manuel Azaña (1880–1940), Premier (twice) and President during the Second Spanish Republic
José María Aznar (born 1953), Prime Minister (1996–2004)
Josep Borrell (born 1947), President of the European Parliament (2004–2007)
Leopoldo Calvo-Sotelo (1926–2008), Prime Minister (1981–1982)
Santiago Carrillo (1915–2012), the General Secretary of the Communist Party of Spain (PCE) from 1960 to 1982
Buenaventura Durruti (1896–1936), anarchist leader
Francisco Franco (1892–1975), Army general and president, ruled Spain for 36 years as "Caudillo" (1939–1975)
María Teresa Fernández de la Vega (born 1949), Spanish Socialist Workers' Party politician and the first female Vice President
Felipe González (born 1942), Prime Minister (1982–1996)
Dolores Ibárruri (1895–1989), known as "La Pasionaria", leader of the Spanish Civil War and communist politician
Eugenio Montero Ríos (1832–1914) Spanish Prime Minister and President of the Senate of Spain.
Juan Carlos I (born 1938), King of Spain (1975–2014)
José Antonio Primo de Rivera (1903–1936)
Mariano Rajoy (born 1955), Prime Minister (2011–2018)
Rodrigo Rato (born 1949), managing director of the IMF since 2004
Adolfo Suárez (1932–2014), Prime Minister (1976–1981)
Javier Solana (born 1942), Secretary General of NATO (1995–1999) and High Representative (since 1999) of the CFSP of the Council of the European Union
José Luis Rodríguez Zapatero (born 1960), Prime Minister (2004–2011)
Felipe VI (born 1968), King of Spain since 2014

Literature 

Rafael Alberti (1902–1999), poet, Cervantes Prize laureate (1983)
Vicente Aleixandre (1888–1984), poet, Nobel Prize laureate (1977)
Pío Baroja (1872–1956), novelist of the Generation of '98
Gustavo Adolfo Bécquer (1836–1870), romantic poet and tale writer
Antonio Buero Vallejo (1916–2000), playwright of the Generation of '36
Pedro Calderón de la Barca (1600–1681), playwright and poet of the Spanish Golden Age
Rosalía de Castro (1837–1885), romanticist and poet
Camilo José Cela (1916–2002), novelist, Nobel Prize laureate (1989)
Miguel de Cervantes (1547–1616), novelist, poet and playwright, author of Don Quixote (1605 and 1615)
Miguel Delibes (1920–2010), novelist, Cervantes Prize laureate (1993)
José Echegaray (1832–1916), dramatist, Nobel Prize laureate (1904)
Amanda Figueras, journalist and writer
Federico García Lorca (1898–1936), poet and dramatist of the Generation of '27
Luis de Góngora (1561–1627), lyric poet considered to be among the most prominent Spanish poets of all time
Jorge Guillén (1893–1984), poet, Cervantes Prize laureate (1976), four-time Nobel Prize nominee
Juan Ramón Jiménez (1881–1958), poet, Nobel Prize laureate (1956)
John of the Cross (1542–1591), mystic poet
Gaspar Melchor de Jovellanos (1744–1811), main figure of the Spanish Age of Enlightenment, philosopher, statesman, poet and essayist
Antonio Machado (1875–1939), leading poet of the Generation of '98
Salvador de Madariaga (1886–1978), essayist and two-time Nobel Prize nominee
Jorge Manrique (1440–1479), major Castilian poet
Juan Marsé (1933–2020), novelist and Cervantes prize laureate
Eduardo Mendoza (born 1943), novelist and Cervantes prize laureate
Emilia Pardo Bazán (1851–1921), writer of prose and poetry who introduced naturalism and feminist ideas to Spanish literature 
Benito Pérez Galdós (1843–1920), realist novelist considered by some to be second only to Cervantes in stature as a Spanish novelist
Arturo Pérez-Reverte (born 1951), best-selling novelist and journalist, member of the Royal Spanish Academy
Marta Pessarrodona (born 1941), Spanish poet, literary critic, essayist, biographer
Francesc Pi i Margall (1824–1901), romanticist writer who was briefly president of the short-lived First Spanish Republic
Berta Piñán (born 1963), writer, poet, politician
Francisco de Quevedo (1580–1645), novelist, essayist and poet, master of Conceptism
Enrique Tierno Galván (1918–1986), essayist and lawyer who served as Mayor of Madrid from 1979 to 1986
Miguel de Unamuno (1864–1936), Basque essayist, novelist, poet, playwright, philosopher, professor of Greek and Classics, and later rector at the University of Salamanca
Ramón María del Valle-Inclán (1866–1936), radical dramatist, novelist and member of the Generation of '98
Garcilaso de la Vega (1501–1536), Renaissance poet who was influential in introducing Italian Renaissance verse forms, poetic techniques, and themes to Spain
"El Inca" Garcilaso de la Vega (1539–1616), first mestizo author in Spanish language, known for his chronicles of Inca history
Félix Lope de Vega (1562–1635), one of the key literary figures of the Spanish Golden Age
María de Zayas y Sotomayor (1590–1660), female novelist of the Spanish Golden Age, and one of the first Spanish feminist authors

Military 

3rd Duke of Alba (Fernando Álvarez de Toledo, 1507–1582), general and governor of the Spanish Netherlands (1567–1573)
Diego García de Paredes (1466–1534),  soldier and duellist, he never commanded an army or rose to the position of a general, but he was a notable figure in the wars, when personal prowess had still a considerable share in deciding combat.
Diego de los Ríos (1850–1911) Spanish Governor-General of the Philippines
Don Juan de Austria (1547–1578), general and admiral; defeated Müezzinzade Ali Pasha in the Battle of Lepanto (1571)
Blas de Lezo (1687–1741), admiral; leading 6 warships and 3.700 men, defeated a British invasion force of 28.000 troops and 186 warships, during the Siege of Cartagena in 1741
Álvaro de Bazán, 1st Marquis of Santa Cruz (1526–1588), admiral
Francisco Javier Castaños, 1st Duke of Bailén (1758–1852), general; he defeated Dupont in the Battle of Bailén (1808)
El Cid (Rodrigo 'Ruy' Díaz de Vivar, c. 1045–1099), knight and hero
Gonzalo Fernández de Córdoba, "El Gran Capitán" (1453–1515), general and strategist of Early modern warfare
Francisco Franco (1892–1975), general; from 1939 caudillo and formal Head of State of Spain
Manuel Alberto Freire de Andrade y Armijo (1767–1835), Spanish cavalry officer and general officer during the Peninsular War, and later Defense Minister
Bernardo de Gálvez (1746–1786), Field Marshal and governor of Louisiana, Spanish hero of the American Revolution
Juan Martín Díez, "El Empecinado" (1775–1825), head of guerrilla bands promoted to Brigadier-General of cavalry during the Peninsular War
Casto Méndez Núñez (1830–1880), admiral
Pedro Navarro, Count of Oliveto (c. 1460–1528), prominent general
Álvaro de Navia Osorio y Vigil, Marqués de Santa Cruz de Marcenado, (1684–1732), general, author of the treatise Reflexiones Militares (Military Reflections)
Pablo Morillo y Morillo (1775–1837), Count of Cartagena and Marquess of La Puerta, a.k.a. El Pacificador (The Peace Maker)  was a Spanish general who fought in the napoleonic wars and hispanoamerican war of independence.
Alexander Farnese, Duke of Parma (1545–1592), Spanish general and military governor of the Spanish Netherlands
Francisco Pérez de Grandallana (1774–1841), brigadier of the Royal Spanish Navy
Ambrosio Spinola, marqués de los Balbases (1569–1630), general
Fernando Villaamil (1845–1898), naval officer, designer of the first destroyer

Models 

 Esther Cañadas (born 1977)
 Jon Kortajarena (born 1985)
 Sheila Marquez (born 1985)
 Judit Mascó (born 1969)
 Marina Pérez (born 1984)
 Inés Sastre (born 1973)

Musicians

Classical 

Isaac Albéniz (1860–1909), composer
Salvador Bacarisse (1898–1963), composer
Pablo Casals (1876–1973), cello player and conductor
Manuel de Falla (1876–1946), composer
Rafael Frühbeck de Burgos (1933–2014), conductor
Enrique Granados (1867–1916), composer
Enrique Jordá (1911–1996), conductor, music director of the San Francisco Symphony (1954–1963)
Francisco Lara (born 1968), composer and conductor
Alicia de Larrocha (1923–2009), pianist
Vicente Martín y Soler (1754–1806), composer
Sofía Noel (1915–2011), Belgian-born soprano and ethnomusicologist
Luis de Pablo (1930–2021), composer
Blas de Laserna, composer
María Teresa Oller (1920-2018), composer and folklorist
Eugenia Osterberger (1852–1932), Galician pianist and composer
Joaquín Rodrigo (1901–1999), composer and pianist, known for his Concierto de Aranjuez
Gaspar Sanz (1640–1710), composer, dominate figure of Spanish baroque music
Jordi Savall (born 1941), early and baroque music conductor and viol player
Andrés Segovia (1893–1987), classical guitarist
Ángel Sola (1859–1910), bandurrista
Antonio Soler (1729–1783), composer, known for his harpsichord sonatas
Francisco Tárrega (1852–1909), composer and classical guitarist
Joaquín Turina (1882–1949), composer
Tomás Luis de Victoria (1548–1611), most famous composer of the 16th century (late Renaissance) in Spain
Paco de Lucía (1947–2014), flamenco guitarist and composer; regarded as one of the finest guitarists in the world and the greatest living guitarist of the flamenco genre

Opera singers

Victoria de los Ángeles (1923–2005), soprano
Maite Arruabarrena (born 1964), mezzo-soprano
Teresa Berganza (1935–2022), mezzo-soprano
Montserrat Caballé (1933–2018), soprano
Avelina Carrera (1871–1939), soprano from Barcelona
Nancy Fabiola Herrera (born 19??), mezzo-soprano
José Carreras (born 1946), one of The Three Tenors
Antonio Cortis (1891–1952), tenor
Plácido Domingo (born 1941), one of The Three Tenors
Manuel del Pópulo Vicente García (1775–1832), tenor
María Gay (1879–1943), mezzo-soprano
Alfredo Kraus (1927–1999), tenor
Hipólito Lázaro (1887–1974), tenor
Carlos Marín (born 1968), baritone, member of operatic quartet Il Divo
[[María José Montiel|María José Montiel]], mezzo-soprano
María Orán (1943–2018), soprano
Adelina Patti (1843–1919), coloratura soprano
Conchita Supervía (1895–1936), mezzo-soprano
Francisco Viñas (1863–1933), tenor

 Singers 

Alaska (born 1963), pop-rock singer
Pablo Alboran (born 1989), singer
Eva Amaral (born 1972), pop and folk rock singer
Ana Belén (born 1951), singer and actress
David Bisbal (born 1979), Almeria singer-songwriter
Miguel Bosé (born 1956), pop singer
Nino Bravo (1944–1973), singer
Camarón de la Isla (1950–1992), flamenco singer, real name José Monje Cruz
Luz Casal (born 1958), pop singer
Estrellita Castro (1908–1983), singer and actress
Rocío Dúrcal (1944–2006), singer
Manolo Escobar (1931–2013), singer 
Manolo García (born 1955), singer-songwriter
Enrique Iglesias (born 1975), singer
Julio Iglesias (born 1943), pop singer
Rocío Jurado (1946–2006), singer
Gloria Lasso (1922–2005), singer 
Lola Flores (1923–1995), singer and flamenco dancer
Lolita Flores (born 1958), singer and actress
Víctor Manuel (born 1947), singer
Alba Molina (born 1978), Flamenco singer
Amaia Montero (born 1976) pop singer
Sarita Montiel (1928–2013), singer and actress
Carlos Núñez (born 1971), bagpipes and Galician (Celtic) music performer
Paloma San Basilio, singer
Jordi Savall (born 1941), film music composer
José Luis Perales (born 1945), singer
Camilo Sesto (1946–2019), singer
Isabel Pantoja (born 1956), singer
Niña Pastori, (born María Rosa García García in 1978), flamenco singer
José Luis Perales (born 1945), singerRaphael (born 1943), pop singer
Joaquín Sabina (born 1949), singer-songwriter
Marta Sanchez (born 1966), singer-songwriter
Alejandro Sanz (born 1968), pop singer
Joan Manuel Serrat (born 1943), Catalan singer-songwriter
Ana Torroja (born 1959), pop rock singer
Enrique Urquijo (1960–1999), founder of the band Los Secretos with his brother Álvaro, lead voice and composer

 Philosophers and humanists 

Alfonso X of Castile (1221–1284), "El Sabio" ("The Wise")
Francisco de Enzinas (1518–1552), humanist and translator of the New Testament
Francisco Giner de los Ríos (1839–1915), philosopher, educator and one of the most influential Spanish intellectuals at the end of the 19th and the beginning of the 20th century.
Baltasar Gracián (1601–1658), author of El Criticón, influenced European philosophers such as Schopenhauer
Bartolomé de Las Casas (1484–1566), humanist, advocate of the rights of Native Americans
Ramon Llull (1232–1315), philosopher, theologian, poet, missionary, and Christian apologist from the Kingdom of Majorca. Inventor of a philosophical system known as the Art and a precursor of the computer, pioneer of computation theory.
Salvador de Madariaga (1886–1978), humanist, co-founder of the College of Europe (1949)
Gregorio Marañón (1887–1960), humanist and medical scientist, important intellectual of the 20th century in Spain
Marcelino Menéndez Pelayo (1856–1912), philologist, historian and erudite
Julián Marías (1914–2005), philosopher; wrote the History of Philosophy
Ramón Menéndez Pidal (1869–1968), philologist, historian and erudite member of Generation of '98
Antonio de Nebrija (1441–1522), scholar, published the first grammar of the Spanish language (Gramática Castellana, 1492), which was the first grammar produced of any Romance language
Rocío Orsi (1976–2014), philosopher, professor
José Ortega y Gasset (1883–1955), philosopher, social and political thinker, author of The Revolt of the Masses (1930)
Bernardino de Sahagún (1499–1590), Franciscan missionary, researched Nahua culture and Nahuatl language and compiled an unparalleled work in Spanish and Náhuatl
George Santayana (1863–1952), philosopher, taught at Harvard, author of The Sense of Beauty (1896) and The Life of Reason (1905–1906)
Fernando Savater (born 1947), philosopher and essayist, known for his writings on ethics
Francisco Suárez (1548–1617), one of the most influential scholastics after Thomas Aquinas
Miguel de Unamuno (1864–1936), existentialist writer and literary theoretician
Juan Luis Vives (1492–1540), prominent figure of Renaissance humanism, taught at Leuven and Oxford (while tutor to Mary Tudor)
Xavier Zubiri (1889–1983), philosopher, critic of classical metaphysics

 Religion 

Francisco Jiménez de Cisneros (1436–1517), religious reformer, bishop, cardinal and statesman
St Dominic of Guzmán (1170–1221), founder of the Order of Preachers
St Isidore of Seville (c. 560–636), bishop, humanist and doctor of the Church
St Ignatius of Loyola (1491–1556), founder of the Society of Jesus
St John of Avila (1500–1569), priest, preacher, theologian and mystic
St John of the Cross (1542–1591), mystic and monastic reformer, doctor of the Church
Saints Nunilo and Alodia (died c. 842/51), child martyrs
Vicente Enrique y Tarancón (1907–1994), bishop, cardinal and president of the Spanish Episcopal Conference
St Teresa of Avila (1515–1582), mystic and monastic reformer, doctor of the Church
Tomás de Torquemada (1420–1498), Grand Inquisitor
St Joaquina Vedruna (1783–1854), founder of the Carmelite Sisters of the Charity
St Vincent Martyr (died c. 304), deacon martyr
St. Toribio de Mogrovejo (1538–1606), prelate of the Catholic Church who served as the Archbishop of Lima from 1579 until his death
St Francis Xavier (1506–1552), missionary and co-founder of the Society of Jesus
Peter of Saint Joseph Betancur (1626–1667), missionary in Guatemala
José de Anchieta (1534–1597), missionary in Brazil; founder of city Sao Paulo and co-founder of city Rio de Janeiro
Bernardo de Alderete (1565–1641), canon of the Mosque-Cathedral of Córdoba

 Science and technology 

José de Acosta (1540–1600), one of the first naturalists and anthropologists of the Americas
Alex Aguilar (born 1957), professor of Animal Biology at the University of Barcelona
Susana Agustí (graduated 1982), biological oceanographer, educator
José María Algué (1856–1930), meteorologist, inventor of the barocyclometer, the nephoscope, and the microseismograph
Rafael Alvarado Ballester (1924–2001)
Jerónimo de Ayanz y Beaumont (1553–1613), registered design for steam-powered water pump for use in mines (1606)
Ignacio Barraquer (1884–1965), leading ophthalmologist, pioneer of cataract surgery
José Ignacio Barraquer (1916–1998), leading ophthalmologist, father of modern refractive surgery; invented the microkeratome and the cryolathe, developed the surgical procedures of keratomileusis and keratophakia
Agustín de Betancourt  (1758–1824), engineer, worked in many rangs from steam engines and balloons to structural engineering and supervised the planning and construction of Saint Petersburg, Kronstadt, Nizhny Novgorod, and other Russian cities
Pino Caballero Gil (born 1968), computer scientist
Ángel Cabrera (1879–1960), naturalist, investigated South American fauna
Blas Cabrera (1878–1945), physicist, worked in the domain of experimental physics with focus in the magnetic properties of matter
Nicolás Cabrera (1913–1989), physicist, did important work on the theories of crystal growth and the oxidisation of metals
Santiago Calatrava (born 1951), architect, sculptor and structural engineer
Pedro Carlos Cavadas Rodríguez (born 1965), pioneering surgeon
Juan de la Cierva (1895–1936), aeronautical engineer, pioneer of rotary flight, inventor of the autogyro
Juan Ignacio Cirac Sasturain (born 1965), one of the pioneers of the field of quantum computing and quantum information theory
Josep Comas i Solà (1868–1937), astronomer, discovered the periodic comet 32P/Comas Solá and 11 asteroids, and in 1907 observed limb darkening of Saturn's moon Titan (the first evidence that the body had an atmosphere)
Carmen Domínguez (born 1969), glaciologist
Pedro Duque (born 1963), astronaut and veteran of two space missions
Fausto de Elhúyar (1755–1833), chemist, joint discoverer of tungsten with his brother Juan José de Elhúyar in 1783
Bernardo Hernández (born 1970), entrepreneur, leading figure in technology
Francisco Hernández (1514–1587), botanicist, carried out important research about the Mexican flora
Jorge Juan y Santacilia (1713–1773), mathematician and naval officer. Determined that the Earth is not perfectly spherical but is oblat. Also measured the heights of the Andes mountains using a barometer.
Carlos Jiménez Díaz (1898–1967), doctor and researcher, leading figure in pathology
Asunción Linares (1921–2005), paleontologist
Gregorio Marañón (1887–1960), doctor and researcher, leading figure in endocrinology
Rafael Mas Hernández (1950–2003), geographer
Narcís Monturiol (1818–1885), physicist and inventor, pioneer of underwater navigation and first machine powered submarine
José Celestino Bruno Mutis (1732–1808), botanicist, doctor, philosopher and mathematician, carried out relevant research about the American flora, founded one of the first astronomic observatories in America (1762)
Severo Ochoa (1905–1993), doctor and biochemist, achieved the synthesis of ribonucleic acid (RNA), Nobel prize laureate (1959)
Mateu Orfila (1787–1853), doctor and chemist, father of modern toxicology, leading figure in forensic toxicology
Joan Oró (1923–2004), biochemist, carried out important research about the origin of life, he worked with NASA on the Viking missions
Isaac Peral (1851–1895), engineer and sailor, designer of the first fully operative military submarine
Santiago Ramón y Cajal (1852–1934), father of Neuroscience, Nobel prize laureate (1906)
Julio Rey Pastor (1888–1962), mathematician, leading figure in geometry
Wifredo Ricart (1897–1974), engineer, designer and executive manager in the automotive industry
Andrés Manuel del Río (1764–1849), geologist and chemist, discovered vanadium (as vanadinite) in 1801
Pío del Río Hortega (1882–1945), neuroscientist, discoverer of the microglia or Hortega cell
Josef de Mendoza y Ríos (1761–1816) was a Spanish astronomer and mathematician of the 18th century, famous for his work on navigation.
Félix Rodríguez de la Fuente (1928–1980), naturalist, leading figure in ornithology, ethology, ecology and science divulgation
Enrique Rojas Montes (born 1949)
Margarita Salas (1938–2019), biochemist, molecular geneticist and researcher
Miguel Sarrias Domingo (1930–2002) was medical director of the Institut Guttmann in Barcelona.
Miguel Servet (1511–1553), scientist, surgeon and humanist; first European to describe pulmonary circulation
María Dolores Soria (1948–2004), paleontologist, researcher, professor, and biologist
Esteban Terradas i Illa (1883–1950), mathematician, physicist and engineer
Leonardo Torres Quevedo (1852–1936), engineer and mathematician, pioneer of automated calculation machines, inventor of the automatic chess, pioneer of radio control, designer of the three-lobed non-rigid Astra-Torres airship and the funicular over the Niagara Falls
Eduardo Torroja (1899–1961), civil engineer, structural architect, world-famous specialist in concrete structures
Josep Trueta (1897–1977), doctor, his new method for treatment of open wounds and fractures helped save many lives during World War II
Antonio de Ulloa (1716–1795), scientist, soldier and author; joint discoverer of element platinum with Jorge Juan y Santacilia (1713–1773)
Arnold of Villanova (c. 1235–1311), alchemist and physician, he discovered carbon monoxide and pure alcohol

 Social scientists 

Gurutzi Arregi (1936–2020), Basque ethnographer
Martín de Azpilicueta (1492–1586), economist, member of the School of Salamanca, precursor of the quantitative theory of money
Manuel Castells (born 1942), sociologist, author of trilogy The Information Age
María Ángeles Durán (born 1942), sociologist and economistManuel Fernández López''' (1947–2014)
Salvador Giner (1934–2019), sociologist, he had researched on social theory, sociology of culture and modern industrial society
Jesús Huerta de Soto (born 1956), major Austrian School economist
Juan José Linz (1926–2013), Sterling Professor of Political and Social Science at Yale; Prince of Asturias Award (1987) and Johan Skytte Prize (1996) laureate
Patricia Mayayo (born 1967), art historian
Claudio Sánchez-Albornoz (1893–1984), historian, prominent specialist in medieval Spanish history
Juan Uría Ríu (1891–1979), historian
Joseph de la Vega (1650–1692), businessman, wrote Confusion of Confusions (1688), first book on stock markets
Francisco de Vitoria (c. 1480/86–1546), member of the School of Salamanca, precursor of international law theory

 Sports 

 Athletics 
Fermín Cacho Ruiz (born 1969), 1500 metres gold (1992 Olympics) and silver (1996 Olympics) medalist
Francisco Javier Gómez Noya (born 1983), triathlon silver (London 2012) medalist; four times ITU Triathlon world champion

 Basketball 

Antonio Díaz-Miguel (1933–2000), coach, enshrined in the Basketball Hall of Fame in 1997
Pau Gasol (born 1980), FC Barcelona and Los Angeles Lakers player, 2001–02 NBA Rookie of the Year Award winner; 2006 FIBA W.C. MVP
Marc Gasol (born 1985), player for Memphis Grizzlies (2008–2019) and Toronto Raptors (2019–present)
Fernando Martín (1962–1989), Estudiantes, Real Madrid and Portland Trail Blazers player
 Jan Martín (born 1984), German-Israeli-Spanish basketball player
Juan Carlos Navarro (born 1980), FC Barcelona and Memphis Grizzlies player

 Boxing 
Pedro Carrasco (1943–2001), 1967 European Lightweight Champion; 1971 WBC's World Lightweight Champion
Javier Castillejo (born 1968), two-time WBC World Jr. Middleweight Champion and one-time WBA Middleweight champion

 Cycling 

Federico Martín Bahamontes (born 1928), 1959 Tour de France winner
Juan José Cobo (born 1981), 2011 Vuelta a España winner
Alberto Contador (born 1982), three-time Tour de France (2007,2009,2010), 2008 Giro d'Italia, 2008 Vuelta a España winner
Pedro Delgado (born 1960), 1988 Tour de France winner
Óscar Freire (born 1976), three-time World Cycling Champion (1999, 2001, 2004)
José Manuel Fuente (1945–1996), twice Vuelta a España winner (1972, 1974), second in Giro d'Italia (1972), third in Tour de France (1973)
Roberto Heras (born 1974), three-time Vuelta a España winner (2000, 2003, 2004)
Miguel Indurain (born 1964), gold medalist (1996 Olympics), 1995 World Time-Trial Champion, World Hour recordman (1994), five consecutive times Tour de France winner (1991–1995), twice Giro d'Italia winner (1992, 1993)
Joan Llaneras (born 1969), gold medalist (2000 Olympics), silver medalist (2004 Olympics), seven-time World Points race or Madison Track Cycling Champion (1996, 1997, 1998, 1999, 2000, 2006, 2007)
Luis Ocaña (1945–1994), 1973 Tour de France winner
Abraham Olano (born 1970), 1995 World Cycling Champion and 1998 World Time-Trial Champion
Óscar Pereiro (born 1977), 2006 Tour de France winner
Samuel Sánchez (born 1978), Beijing 2008 Olympic Road Race Gold Medal
Carlos Sastre (born 1975), 2008 Tour de France winner
Joane Somarriba (born 1972), three-time Grande Boucle winner (2000, 2001, 2003)
Guillermo Timoner (born 1926), six-time World Motor paced Track Cycling Champion (1955, 1959, 1960, 1962, 1964, 1965)

 Football (soccer) 

Iker Casillas (born 1981), goalkeeper and Real Madrid; captain of Spain's team that won UEFA Euro 2008, the 2010 FIFA World Cup and Euro 2012
Francisco Gento (1933–2022), Real Madrid player; winner of six UEFA Champions League
Raúl González (born 1977), first player to reach 50 goals in UEFA Champions League
Xavi Hernández (born 1980), midfielder and FC Barcelona player; UEFA Euro 2008 MVP
Andrés Iniesta (born 1984), midfielder and FC Barcelona player; scored the winning goal at the 2010 FIFA World Cup Final; UEFA Euro 2012 MVP
Alexia Putellas (born 1994), FC Barcelona Femení midfielder and two-time Ballon d'Or Féminin winner
Fernando Torres (born 1984), striker and Chelsea player; scored the winning goal at the Euro 2008 Final; winner of Golden Boot at Euro 2012
David Villa (born 1981), striker and FC Barcelona player; Spain's all-time top goalscorer
Andoni Zubizarreta (born 1961), Spanish international
Gerard Pique (born 1979), plays for the club FC Barcelona, and is a defender

 Golf 
Seve Ballesteros (1957–2011), winner of five major championships
Sergio García (born 1980), winner of a major championship
Miguel Ángel Jiménez (born 1964), winner of 13 European Tour titles winner
José María Olazábal (born 1966), winner of two major championships
Jon Rahm Rodríguez (born 1994), the first Spanish golfer to win the US Open (June 20, 2021) and winner of 12 other tournaments

 Motor sports 
 
Fernando Alonso (born 1981), 2005 and 2006 Formula One World Champion
Jaime Alguersuari (born 1990), 2008 British Formula Three champion
Álvaro Bautista (born 1984), motorcycle racing raider, 125cc champion of the World in 2006
Carlos Checa (born 1972), GP motorcycle racing rider and Superbike World Champion in 2011
Marc Coma (born 1976), won the Dakar Rally in 2006
Àlex Crivillé (born 1970), 500cc GP motorcycle racing World Champion in 1999
Marc Gené (born 1974), Formula One driver
Jorge Lorenzo (born 1987), 2006 and 2007 GP motorcycle racing 250cc World Champion, 2010, 2012, and 2015 MotoGP World Champion
Marc Márquez (born 1993), Grand Prix motorcycle road racer, and is the 2013, 2014, 2016 and 2017 Moto GP World Champion
Jorge Martínez Aspar (born 1962), GP motorcycle racing rider, four-time World Champion
Pedro Martínez de la Rosa (born 1971), Formula One driver
Ángel Nieto (1947–2017), GP motorcycle racing rider, 12+1 times World Champion
Daniel Pedrosa (born 1985), youngest GP motorcycle racing World Champion of 125cc and 250cc
Carlos Sainz (born 1962), 1990 and 1992 World Rally Champion and 2010 Dakar Rally winner
Carlos Sainz, Jr. (born 1994), Formula One driver

 Rugby union
Oriol Ripol, professional rugby union player for Worcester Warriors; considered the greatest Spaniard to ever play the game
Cédric Garcia, professional rugby player for Aviron Bayonnais

 Tennis 
 
Galo Blanco (born 1976), professional tennis player
Sergi Bruguera (born 1971), 1993 and 1994 French Open Men's Singles Champion
Àlex Corretja (born 1974), 1998 ATP Tour World Champion
Albert Costa (born 1975), 2002 French Open Men's Singles Champion
Juan Carlos Ferrero (born 1980), 2003 French Open Men's Singles Champion
Andrés Gimeno (1937–2019), 1972 French Open Men's Singles Champion
Conchita Martínez (born 1972), 1994 Wimbledon Women's Singles Champion
Carlos Moyá (born 1976), 1998 French Open Men's Singles Champion
Garbiñe Muguruza (born 1993), 2016 French Open and 2017 Wimbledon Women's Singles Champion
Rafael Nadal (born 1986), former World Number 1, 2005 French Open, 2006 French Open, 2007 French Open, 2008 French Open, 2010 French Open, 2011 French Open, 2012 French Open 2013 French Open, 2014 French Open, 2017 French Open, 2008 Wimbledon, 2010 Wimbledon, 2009 Australian Open, 2010 US Open, 2013 US Open, 2017 US Open Men's Singles Champion, 2008 Olympics and 2016 Olympics gold medallist
Manuel Orantes (born 1949), 1975 U.S. Open Men's Singles Champion
Virginia Ruano Pascual (born 1973), eight Grand Slam Doubles titles winner
Arantxa Sánchez Vicario (born 1971), ten Grand Slam titles winner (four singles, six doubles)
Emilio Sánchez Vicario (born 1965), three Grand Slam Doubles titles winner
Javier Sánchez Vicario, professional tennis player, brother of Aranxta
Manuel Santana (1938–2021), 5 Grand Slam titles winner (four singles, one doubles)
Fernando Verdasco Carmona (born 1983), professional tennis player

 Others 

Graciano Canteli, diplomat
Carlos Dominguez Cidon (1959–2009), chef
Pilar Civeira, professor of medicine in Pamplona
Charo Sádaba, professor of advertising in Pamplona
María Josefa Cerrato Rodríguez (1897–1981), first woman veterinarian
José Andrés (born 1969), chef
Ferran Adrià (born 1962), chef
Joaquín Cortés (born 1969), dancer
Rosario Hernández Diéguez (1916–1936), newspaper hawker and trade unionist
Juan March Ordinas (1880–1962), politician and businessman
Federica Montseny (1905–1994), anarchist, politician and writer
Ana Morales (born 1982), flamenco dancer and choreographer
Amancio Ortega Gaona (born 1936), entrepreneur
Pepita de Oliva (1830–1871), dancer
Ana María Pérez del Campo (born 1936), lawyer, feminist
Juan Pujol, alias Garbo (1912–1988), double agent who played a key role in the success of D-Day towards the end of World War II
Tamara Rojo (born 1974), prima ballerina'' of the London's Royal Ballet (since 2000); Prince of Asturias Award of Arts laureate (2005)
Diego Salcedo (1575–1644), first Spaniard killed by Puerto Rican Taínos
Elbira Zipitria (1906–1982), Spanish-Basque educator, promoter of the Basque language

See also 
List of people by nationality
List of Andalusians
List of Aragonese
List of Balearics
List of Basques
List of Catalans
List of Galician people
List of Spanish Jews
List of Valencians

External links
Famous Spanish people
Top 15 most famous Spanish people